Persap stand for Persatuan Sepakbola Alor dan Pantar (en: Football Association of Alor and Pantar). Persap Alor is an Indonesian football club based in Alor Regency, Alor Island, East Nusa Tenggara. They currently compete in the Liga 3 and their homeground is Batunirwala Stadium.

References

External links
Liga-Indonesia.co.id

Football clubs in Indonesia
Football clubs in East Nusa Tenggara